ORV Sagar Nidhi is an ice-strengthened multidisciplinary vessel operated by the National Institute of Ocean Technology, India. It was constructed at Fincantieri, Italy. The 104-metre-long vessel has fully automatic diesel-electric propulsion equipped with dynamic positioning system, azimuth thrusters, and a winch to hoist 60 tonnes from a depth of 6,000 metres.

She is expected to support research in the Indian and Antarctic Oceans.

Sagar Nidhi will be utilized for deep sea mining, launching of ROV's, AUV's, manned and unmanned submersibles and exploration of gas hydrates.

References 

Research vessels of India
Ships built by Fincantieri
2007 ships